Ngawa County, or Aba or Ngaba, is a county in the northwest of Sichuan Province, China. It is under the administration of the Ngawa Tibetan and Qiang Autonomous Prefecture. It is located in the remote northwestern part of the prefecture, on the border with Qinghai (to the northwest) and Gansu (to the north). The county seat is Ngawa Town.

Self-immolation incident

On 16 March 2011 a 20-year-old Tibetan monk called Phuntsok set fire to himself at a market, in protest against allegedly repressive government policies in Tibet Autonomous Region and other Tibetan populated areas in China. He died in hospital early in the morning of 17 March. Following Phuntsok's self-immolation, hundreds of monks from the same monastery, Kirti monastery in Ngaba County, and other local residents staged another protest.

Climate

Administrative divisions
Ngawa County(Aba County)  has not towns and 4 townships:
Towns:
 -
Townships:
Andou
Anqiang
Chalisi
Dege

See also
Phuntsog self-immolation incident
Self-immolation protests by Tibetans in China

Footnotes

References
 *Dorje, Gyurme (2009). Footprint Tibet Handbook. Footprint Books. .

County-level divisions of Sichuan
Ngawa Tibetan and Qiang Autonomous Prefecture